Konstantinos Ditsios (born 1964) is a Greek rower. He competed in the men's double sculls event at the 1988 Summer Olympics.

References

1964 births
Living people
Greek male rowers
Olympic rowers of Greece
Rowers at the 1988 Summer Olympics
Place of birth missing (living people)